Dolbino is a rural locality (a village) in Kupreyevskoye Rural Settlement, Gus-Khrustalny District, Vladimir Oblast, Russia. The population was 323 as of 2010.

Geography 
Dolbino is located 64 km southeast of Gus-Khrustalny (the district's administrative centre) by road. Novo-Durovo is the nearest rural locality.

References 

Rural localities in Gus-Khrustalny District